The Middle Creek Wildlife Management Area is a  Wildlife Management Area located in Lancaster and Lebanon counties, Pennsylvania.  It is managed by the Pennsylvania Game Commission.

The area lakes seasonally get up to 200,000 migrating snow geese. The Horse-Shoe Trail goes through the area just south of the main impoundment dam.

References

External links 

 Middle Creek Wildlife Management Area (official Pennsylvania Game Commission web site)

Protected areas of Lancaster County, Pennsylvania
Protected areas of Lebanon County, Pennsylvania